The 2016 Central Penn Capitals season was the fourth season for the American indoor football franchise, and their fourth in the American Indoor Football. On October 14, 2015, it was announced that the Capitals were moving to Harrisburg and renaming themselves the Central Penn Capitals.

Schedule
Key:

Exhibition
All start times are local to home team

Regular season
All start times are local to home team

Standings

Playoffs
All start times are local to home team

When initially announced, the Capitals were set to play the Northern Division's first-seeded West Michigan Ironmen. On May 30, the Capitals were replaced with the Southern Division's third-seeded Myrtle Beach Freedom and the Capitals were held out of the playoffs altogether.

Roster

References

2016 American Indoor Football season
2016 in sports in Pennsylvania
2016 Central Penn Capitals season